The White Ridge Quartzite is a geologic formation in central New Mexico. It has a maximum age of 1650 million years (Ma), corresponding to the Statherian period.

History of investigation
The unit was first defined by Stark and Dapples in 1946, during their mapping of the Los Pinos Mountains, and named for White Ridge, a prominent ridge in the northeastern part of the mountains.

Geology
The quartzite often contains significant sericite, biotite, and hematite. The beds dip steeply to the west, at a dip angle of 32 to 70 degrees. The formation overlies the Abajo Formation and in turn is overlain by the Estadio Schist. 

Detrital zircon grains in the formation are almost identical in age and isotope composition to the underlying Sevilleta metarhyolite, suggesting that the sediments of the quartzite were weathered almost exclusively from local sources. The minimum zircon age is about 1650 Ma, and radiometric dating of underlying and overlying formations place the age of the White Ridge Quarzite between 1650 and 1588 Ma.

References

Precambrian formations of New Mexico
Paleoproterozoic magmatism
Proterozoic North America